Léaz is a commune in the Ain department in eastern France.

In addition to the main village, the commune has three hamlets: Grésin, Lavoux and Longeray.

Population

See also
Communes of the Ain department

References

External links 

Communes of Ain
Ain communes articles needing translation from French Wikipedia